Gallup, an American analytics and advisory company, has conducted an annual opinion poll to determine the most admired man and woman in the United States at the end of most years since 1946. Americans are asked, without prompting, to say which man and woman "living today in any part of the world" they admire the most. The results of the poll published as a top-ten list. In most years, the most admired man has been the incumbent president of the United States, and the most admired woman has been the first lady. 

The incumbent president has been the most admired man in 58 of the 72 years in which the poll has been conducted. Dwight D. Eisenhower and Barack Obama have each been the most admired man 12 times. In his lifetime, the evangelist Billy Graham had 61 appearances in the top-ten list, the most of any individual, and 8 second-place finishes. Other men with many appearances are Ronald Reagan (31), Jimmy Carter (28), and Pope John Paul II (27). The incumbent pope has finished in the top-ten list every year since 1977. The survey has been considered, in part, to be a test of name recognition. While the top of the list is often predictable, scholars have found appearances further down in the top ten to be illuminating. For instance, in 1958, Governor Orval Faubus of Arkansas, a segregationist, appeared on the list in the wake of the Little Rock Nine civil-rights episode. A portion of those surveyed have chosen a friend or relative instead of a public figure.

Two former first ladies have had the most appearances as the most admired woman: Eleanor Roosevelt and Hillary Clinton. In the late 1940s and 1950s, Roosevelt was an ambassador to the United Nations, serving as the chair of the United Nations Commission on Human Rights and leading the drafting of the Universal Declaration of Human Rights, and was widely referred to as the "First Lady of the World". Clinton served as the first lady from 1993 to 2001, a senator from New York, the secretary of state, and was the first American female presidential nominee of either of the two major American political parties when she ran in the 2016 presidential election.  Clinton topped the list in 22 of the 25 polls conducted during between 1993 and 2017, including 16 times in a row from 2002 to 2017, before Michelle Obama became the most admired woman in 2018. Roosevelt was named the most admired woman 13 times. The highest number of top-ten appearances belongs to Queen Elizabeth II, with 52. Despite never winning, broadcaster Oprah Winfrey has finished in the top ten a total of 33 times, including finishing second 14 times.

In 1980, Mother Teresa and Rosalynn Carter tied for the most admired woman, and in 2019, Barack Obama and Donald Trump shared the title of most admired man. For the years 1946 and 1947, the "most admired person" was asked; the "most admired woman" was not asked in 1967. No poll was conducted in 1976. No poll was conducted in 2021 or 2022; it is unknown whether Gallup has stopped doing it.

Most admired man and woman

See also 
 Gallup's List of Most Widely Admired People of the 20th Century

Note

References

External links 

 Gallup's most admired man and woman poll – news.Gallup.com

Opinion polling in the United States
Top people lists
American culture
United States politics-related lists